Pericyma scandulata is a moth of the  family Erebidae.

Distribution
It is found in Uganda, Zimbabwe and South Africa.

References

Ophiusina
Lepidoptera of South Africa
Lepidoptera of Uganda
Lepidoptera of Zimbabwe
Moths of Sub-Saharan Africa